MacGuyver Dean Greyling (born 1 January 1986) is a rugby union player who represents  in Pro Rugby D2. He was educated at Afrikaanse Hoër Seunskool.

Playing career
Greyling was one of the stars of the 2004 Craven Week competition, and represented the Blue Bulls' age-group teams from 2005 to 2007. He made his Super Rugby debut for the franchise in 2008. In October 2010, Greyling was selected to the Springbok squad of 39 players to prepare for the November tour of Europe.

Greyling made his Springbok debut in the starting line-up against Australia on 23 July 2011 in Sydney. He played his second test for his country the following week against the All Blacks in Wellington. He was not selected for the 2011 Rugby World Cup.

He played in his last test (from the bench) on 15 September 2012 against New Zealand in Dunedin, but after receiving a yellow card for foul play in the 64th minute, was not selected again for the Springboks.

He moved to French team  prior to the 2016–2017 season.

Name
Born "Dean Greyling", he legally changed his name as a child to "Macguyver", as he was a fan of the TV character by that name, refusing to answer to "Dean". Though he hasn't legally changed his name back, he now goes by "Dean".

References

External links

Bulls Profile
itsrugby.co.uk Profile

1986 births
Living people
People from Mogalakwena Local Municipality
Bulls (rugby union) players
Blue Bulls players
South African rugby union players
Rugby union props
South Africa international rugby union players
White South African people
Rugby union players from Limpopo